Vogrie House forms the centrepiece of Vogrie Country Park in Midlothian. 

It was built for James Dewar and his family in 1876 by Andrew Heiton, the town architect for Perth. Dewar was the creator of Dewar's whisky.

The current house is an example of Victorian baronial splendour and is said to be one of the best surviving examples of Heiton's work. The house was a typical country house with a library, servants' quarters and many bedrooms.

Transformed in 1926 into a nursing home for the Royal Edinburgh Hospital, by Ernest Auldjo Jamieson the house was sold on to local government in the 1950s and had a role during the Cold War as a control centre for communications.

Early history
John Lumsden of Blanerne sold the lands of Vogrie to Samuel Cockburn of Templehall and his wife Elizabeth Douglas in 1590. The transaction included the assent of members of the wider Lumsden family, and was witnessed by the Edinburgh merchant Clement Cor, father-in-law of Robert Lumsden of Ardrie.

References

External links
Vogrie Country Park - official site, includes Vogrie House

See also
List of places in Midlothian

Historic house museums in Midlothian
Country houses in Midlothian
Houses completed in 1876